CD Austria was an Austrian computer magazine published monthly by CDA Verlag, Perg that was owned by Harald Gutzelnig from 1995 until July 2014. It was part of the  Österreichische Auflagenkontrolle. The edition of CD Austria was 16.485 copies during the first half of 2010.

Content 
There were two different types of magazines which alternated every two months. CD Austria Praxis discussed themes like hints for office suites and computer hobbyists. It also  included a double-sided DVD which contains software on one side and video tutorials on the other. CD Austria also tests new hardware and software as well as websites.

In Germany, it was issued under the alternating titles of PC News (corresponding to CD Austria) and PC User (corresponding to CD Austria Praxis) every two months.

See also
 List of magazines in Austria

References

1995 establishments in Austria
2014 disestablishments in Germany
Computer magazines published in Germany
Defunct computer magazines
Defunct magazines published in Germany
Defunct magazines published in Austria
German-language magazines
Magazines established in 1995
Magazines disestablished in 2014
Monthly magazines published in Austria